Banbueng Football Club (Thai: สโมสรฟุตบอลบ้านบึง) is a Thai football club based in Chonburi Province. The club participates in Thai League 3 Lower Region, the third tier of Thai football league system. The team plays their home matches at IPE Chonburi Stadium. The club is currently playing in the Thai League 3 Eastern region.

History 
In the case of Mr. Piti Polnukulpanich Director of Royal Raya Sports Co., Ltd. and President of Phuket F.C. Club. On November 28, 2017, the club announced a decision to cancel the team after FIFA ordered the former three foreign players to pay the amount of 83 million in a case filed from 2012-2015. The former executives canceled the unfair contract. Then there is the capital group from TTM or Thailand Tobacco Monopoly Football Club. Led by  Nisit Srisang, a former technical advisor and secretary of the TTM F.C., was appointed as vice president and general manager of Phuket City Team, as well as Mr. Sujit Kalyanamit, former president of the TTM F.C. The new management team is Phuket City will be over the team of Banbueng F.C. to do the competition in the Thai League 3 South Region.

In 2020, the club was renamed back to Banbueng Football Club due to the take over of Banbueng's boards again. They have moved their ground back to Chonburi Province too.

Crest history

Stadium and locations

Seasonal record

References

External links
 

Association football clubs established in 2018
Football clubs in Thailand
Phuket province
2018 establishments in Thailand